Parablechnum howeanum, synonym Blechnum howeanum, is a fern in the family Blechnaceae. The specific epithet refers to the locality to which it is endemic.

Description
The plant is a terrestrial fern. The creeping or shortly erect rhizome has dense apical scales. Its fronds are up to 70 cm long and 40 cm wide.

Distribution and habitat
The fern is endemic to Australia's subtropical Lord Howe Island in the Tasman Sea. It grows in shaded mountain forest, especially on the summits of Mounts Gower and Lidgbird.

References

Blechnaceae
Endemic flora of Lord Howe Island
Plants described in 1993
Ferns of Australia